FC Kinotavr Podolsk was a Russian football team from Podolsk. It played professionally for a single season in 1992 in the Russian Second Division, losing 38 out of the 40 games they played, allowing 147 goals and recording a 0-13 and 0-10 losses.

External links
  Team history at KLISF

Association football clubs established in 1992
Association football clubs disestablished in 1993
Defunct football clubs in Russia
Football in Moscow Oblast
1992 establishments in Russia
1993 disestablishments in Russia